The 1999 Bank of Ireland All-Ireland Senior Football Championship was the 113th edition of the GAA's premier Gaelic football competition. The championship began on 9 May 1999 and ended on 26 September 1999.

Galway entered the championship as defending champions; however, they were beaten by Mayo in the Connacht final.

On 26 September 1999, Meath beat Cork by 1-11 to 1-8 in the All-Ireland final, thus winning their second All-Ireland title in four years and their seventh in all. In the process, they denied Cork the Double, the hurlers having claimed the Liam MacCarthy Cup two weeks previously.

Format
The provincial championships were run on a knock-out basis as usual, with the provincial winners going on to contest the All-Ireland semi finals. The Leinster Senior Football Championship consisted of 2 preliminary rounds to determine the 8th team in the Leinster quarter finals.

The usual knock-out four-province setup was used.  played in the Connacht Senior Football Championship for the first time. Normal format is back for the Munster championship with two quarter-finals and semi-finals.

Results

Connacht Senior Football Championship

Quarter-finals

Semi-finals

Final

Leinster Senior Football Championship

1st Preliminary round

2nd Preliminary round

Quarter-finals

Semi-finals

Final

Munster Senior Football Championship

Quarter-finals

Semi-finals

Final

Ulster Senior Football Championship

Preliminary round

Quarter-finals

Semi-finals

Final

All-Ireland Senior Football Championship

Semi-finals

Final

Championship statistics

Miscellaneous

 Both Red and Yellow cards were introduced to all matches played from this year onwards.
 New York in their first season in the Connacht championship like London play each county in rotation.
 On 20 June 1999, the Munster semi-final between Cork vs Limerick was the first ever championship game played at Páirc Uí Rinn, Cork.
 Armagh won the Ulster title for the first time since 1982.
 Meath-Armagh All Ireland semi-final was the first championship meeting between the teams.

Top scorers

Overall

Single game